Bosnia and Herzegovina competed at the 2022 Mediterranean Games in Oran, Algeria from 25 June to 6 July 2022.

Medal summary

Medal table

|  style="text-align:left; width:78%; vertical-align:top;"|

|  style="text-align:left; width:22%; vertical-align:top;"|

Athletics

Men
Track & road events

Field events

Boules

Men

Boxing

Men

Women

Cycling

Men

Gymnastics

Artistic

Men

Judo
 

Men

Women

Karate 

Men

Women

Shooting

Men

Women

Mixed

Swimming

Women

Taekwondo
 

Men

Women

Weightlifting

Men

References

Nations at the 2022 Mediterranean Games
2022
Mediterranean Games